The 1948 population census in Bosnia and Herzegovina was the seventh census of the population of Bosnia and Herzegovina. The Socialist Federal Republic of Yugoslavia conducted a population census on 15 March 1948. On the territory of Socialist Republic of Bosnia and Herzegovina 2,565,277 persons lived.

Overall

References 

Censuses in Bosnia and Herzegovina
1948 in Bosnia and Herzegovina
Bosnia